The 1919 New Mexico A&M Aggies football team was an American football team that represented New Mexico College of Agriculture and Mechanical Arts (now known as New Mexico State University) during the 1919 college football season.  In their first year under head coach Anthony Savage, the Aggies compiled a 2–3–1 record. The team played its home games on Miller Field.

Schedule

References

New Mexico AandM
New Mexico State Aggies football seasons
New Mexico AandM Aggies football